Leptodeuterocopus citrogaster is a moth of the family Pterophoridae. It was described by Thomas Bainbrigge Fletcher in 1910 and is known from the Moluccas. It is the type species of the genus Leptodeuterocopus.

References

Deuterocopinae